Chanchuri Union is an Union Parishad under Lohagara Upazila of Narail District in the division of Khulna, Bangladesh. It has an area of 46.62 km2 (18.00 sq mi)  and a population of 15,285.

References

Unions of Kalia Upazila
Unions of Narail District
Unions of Khulna Division